The following table shows the European record progression in the men's 100 metres, as ratified by the European Athletic Association.

Hand timing

Automatic timing

References 

100 metres
100 metres
European 100 metres record